Hexafluoroacetone (HFA) is a chemical compound with the formula (CF3)2CO. It is structurally similar to acetone; however, its reactivity is markedly different. It a colourless, hygroscopic, nonflammable, highly reactive gas characterized by a musty odour. The most common form of this substance is hexafluoroacetone sesquihydrate (1.5 H2O), which is a hemihydrate of hexafluoropropane-2,2-diol , a geminal diol.

Synthesis
The industrial route to HFA involves treatment of hexachloroacetone with HF:
(CCl3)2CO + 6 HF → (CF3)2CO + 6 HCl

Hexafluoropropylene oxide rearranges to give HFA.

In the laboratory, HFA can be prepared in a two step process from perfluoropropene.  In the first step KF catalyzes the reaction of the alkene with elemental sulfur to give the 1,3-dithietane [(CF3)2CS]2. This species is then oxidized by iodate to give (CF3)2CO.

Uses
Hexafluoroacetone is used in the production of hexafluoroisopropanol:
(CF3)2CO + H2 → (CF3)2CHOH

It is also used as a precursor to hexafluoroisobutylene, a monomer used in polymer chemistry, and as a building block in the synthesis of midaflur, bisphenol AF, 4,4′-(hexafluoroisopropylidene)diphthalic anhydride, and alitame.

Reactivity
Hexafluoroacetone is an electrophile. Nucleophiles attack at the carbonyl carbon. In water, hexafluoroacetone predominantly exists as the hydrate. The equilibrium constant (Keq) for the formation of this geminal diol is 106 M−1. The analogous equilibrium for acetone is an unfavorable 10−3 M−1. Hexafluoroacetone-hydrates are acidic.  In an analogous reaction, ammonia adds to hexafluoroacetone to give the hemiaminal (CF3)2C(OH)(NH2) which can be dehydrated with phosphoryl chloride to give the imine (CF3)2CNH.

See also
Bromoacetone
Chloroacetone
Fluoroacetone
Trifluoroacetone
Novec 1230
Hexafluorothioacetone

References

Trifluoromethyl compounds
Ketones
Perfluorinated compounds
Trifluoromethyl ketones